Dvořák (feminine Dvořáková) is a Czech surname, originally referring to a servant or an official of manorial estate or royal court. Notable people include:

People

Dvořák or Dvorak

Arts
 Ann Dvorak (1912–1979), American film actress (stage name)
 Antonín Dvořák (1841–1904), Czech composer
 František Dvořák (painter), (1862-1927), Czech painter
 Josef Dvořák (born 1942), Czech actor
 Max Dvořák (1874–1921), Austrian art historian
 Tomáš Dvořák (1978–), Czech composer

Science
 August Dvorak (1894–1975), co-creator of the Dvorak keyboard layout
 John C. Dvorak (born 1952), computer-industry columnist and new-media personality
 Vernon Dvorak (1928–2022), meteorologist, developer of method to estimate tropical-cyclone intensity

Sports
 Bedřich Dvořák canoeist
 Ben Dvorak, NFL football player
 Bill Dvořák (born 1958), American pioneering whitewater rafter
 Christian Dvorak (born 1996), American ice hockey player
 David Dvořák, Czech mixed-martial artist
 Dominik Dvořák (born 1992), Czech bobsledder
 Dusty Dvorak (born 1958), American volleyball player
 Filip Dvořák (born 1988), Czech canoeist
 Karel Dvořák (biathlete), Czechoslovak cross-country skier
 Libor Dvořák canoeist
 Milan Dvořák (born 1934), Czechoslovak footballer
 Miroslav Dvořák (ice hockey) (1951-2008), Czechoslovak ice hockey player
 Oldřich Dvořák, Czech wrestler
 Pavel Dvořák (born 1989), Czech footballer
 Radek Dvořák (born 1977), Czech NHL ice hockey player
 Tomáš Dvořák (born 1972), Czech decathlon and heptathlon athlete

Dvořáková or Dvorakova 
 Denisa Dvořáková (born 1989), Czech model
 Eva Švankmajerová née Dvořáková (1940-2005), Czech surrealist artist
 Helena Dvořáková (born 1979), Czech actress
 Veronika Dvořáková (born 2000), Czech handball player

Dvorschák, Dworschak or Dworshak
 Gábor Dvorschák (born 1989), Hungarian football defender
 Henry Dworshak (1894–1962), United States Senator from Idaho
 Leo Ferdinand Dworschak (1900–1976), Roman Catholic Bishop of Fargo

Other uses 
 Dvorak (game), a customizable card game
 Dvorak Awards for "excellence in telecommunications"
 Dworshak Dam, a hydroelectric, concrete gravity dam in Clearwater County, Idaho, United States
 Dvorak keyboard layout, an alternative to the QWERTY keyboard layout, named after August Dvorak
 Dworshak National Fish Hatchery, a "mitigation" hatchery
 Dvorak technique, a subjective method of deriving cyclone intensity from satellite imagery

Czech-language surnames
West Slavic-language surnames